Boyacá Department was one of the departments of Gran Colombia.

Borders 
It had borders to 
 Magdalena Department, Zulia Department, Apure Department in the North,
 Orinoco Department in the East,
 Azuay Department in the South,
 Cauca Department, Cundinamarca Department in the West.

Subdivisions 
4 provinces and 29 cantons:

 Tunja Province. Capital: Tunja. Cantones: Tunja, Chiquinquirá, Garagoa, Leyva, Moniquirá, Muzo, Santa Rosa, Sogamoso, Suata y Turmeque.
 Casanare Province. Capital: Pore. Cantones: Pore, Arauca, Chire, Macuco, Nunchía y Tame.
 Pamplona Province. Capital: Pamplona. Cantones: Pamplona, Bucaramanga, Girón, Piedecuesta, Salazar, San José de Cúcuta y Villa del Rosario.
 Socorro Province. Capital: Socorro. Cantones: Socorro, Barichara, Charalá, San Gil, Vélez y Zapatoca.

Departments of Gran Colombia
1824 establishments in Gran Colombia
1830 disestablishments in Gran Colombia
States and territories established in 1824
States and territories disestablished in 1830